MK6 may refer to:
MK postcode area, a postal district in the United Kingdom.
Mario Kart Wii, the sixth game in the Mario Kart series released for the Wii in 2008.
Mortal Kombat: Deception, the sixth game in the Mortal Kombat series.
Volkswagen Golf Mk6, a car released by Volkswagen in 2006.